The European Rowing U23 Championships  is an international rowing regatta organized by FISA (the International Rowing Federation).  It is a week-long event for best rowers under 23 year age.

History
The inaugural championship took place in September 2017.

Editions

Medals (2017-2022)

2017

2018

2019

2020

2021

2022

See also
 European Rowing Championships

External links
 World Rowing website

 
Recurring sporting events established in 2017
Rowing competitions
Under-23 sports competitions
2017 establishments in Europe
Rowing